Constantia is a South African dessert wine. It is made from Muscat Blanc à Petits Grains (Muscat de Frontignan) grapes grown in the district of Constantia, City of Cape Town. In the eighteenth and nineteenth centuries it was widely exported to Europe. However, production of Constantia ceased in the late nineteenth century following the devastation of South African vineyards by the phylloxera epidemic. Production resumed at Klein Constantia in 1986, at Groot Constantia in 2003 and at Buitenverwachting in 2007.

History
In 1685, the Constantia estate was established in a valley facing False Bay by the Governor of the Cape, Simon van der Stel whose "Constantia wyn" soon acquired a good reputation. In 1705, Naturalist François Valentyn called it "The coicest wine to be found at the Cape...so divine and enticing in taste. But it was Hendrik Cloete, who bought the homestead in 1778, who really made Constantia famous, with an unfortified wine made from a blend of mostly Muscat de Frontignan (Muscat Blanc à Petits Grains), Pontac, red and white Muscadel and a little Chenin Blanc. It became a favorite of European kings and emperors, such as Frederick the Great, Queen Victoria, and Napoleon who had it ordered from his exile on St Helena.

In 1861, however, the Gladstone government removed empire preferential tariffs, and as a result exports nearly dried up, and the golden era was brought to an end when the vineyards were decimated by phylloxera and powdery mildew, In 1980 Duggie Jooste bought Klein Constantia, redeveloped the farm, and with the help of then winemaker Ross Gower & Professor Chris Orferr of Stellenbosch University created and began selling a new recreated version of the early Constantia wines made from Muscat Blanc à Petits Grains.

All three Constantia estates produce a homage to the original recipe, with Groot Constantia being called Grand Constance, "1769" at Buitenverwachting and "Vin de Constance" at Klein Constantia.

In popular culture
 In Sense and Sensibility (1811), Jane Austen's character Mrs Jennings recommends a glass of "the finest old Constantia wine" for the broken-hearted Marianne, on the grounds that it helped her late husband's colicky gout; Elinor, though amused by the incongruity, still drinks the wine to try "its healing powers on a disappointed heart" – her own.
In Charles Dickens' last (and unfinished) novel, The Mystery of Edwin Drood, Constantia wine is served to the reverend Septimus by his mother. "As, whenever the Reverend Septimus fell a-musing, his good mother took it to be an infallible sign that he ‘wanted support,’ the blooming old lady made all haste to the dining-room closet, to produce from it the support embodied in a glass of Constantia and a home-made biscuit."
 In Charles Baudelaire's  Les fleurs du mal poem XXVI entitled Sed non satiata Baudelaire compares the charms of his beloved to the pleasures brought by Nuits-Saint-Georges and Constantia wine: "Even more than Constantia, than opium, than Nuits, I prefer the elixir of your mouth, where love performs its slow dance."
In Joris-Karl Huysmans' novel, A rebours, the protagonist, Floressas Des Esseintes, extols the virtues of Constantia wine and takes some in an attempt to alleviate a weak stomach (Chapter 13).
German poet Friedrich Gottlieb Klopstock begged forgiveness for preferring "Daughter Konstanzia" to "old Father Johann".

References

Dessert wine
South African wine
Economy of Cape Town